Dominic Gates is an Irish-American aerospace journalist for The Seattle Times, former math teacher, and Pulitzer Prize winner. He has been assigned to cover Boeing for The Times since 2003. Gates was a co-recipient of the 2020 Pulitzer Prize in National Reporting alongside Steve Miletich, Mike Baker, and Lewis Kamb for their coverage of the Boeing 737 MAX crashes and investigations.

Early life

Gates was born in Dungannon, Northern Ireland, as one of six children. He was educated at St Patrick's Academy in Dungannon and graduated with a mathematics degree from Queen's University, Belfast. Gates taught high school mathematics in Northern Ireland and Zimbabwe before relocating to the United States.

Journalism career

While having no formal training in journalism, Gates contributed several articles to the magazine Fortnight on an unpaid basis. After moving to Seattle with his wife in 1992, he took on several freelancing assignments for various magazines and news organizations while continuing to teach mathematics. Gates was hired by technology magazine The Industry Standard in 2000, but the magazine went out of business 18 months later.

Gates then joined The Seattle Times in 2003 as an aerospace reporter, covering the local Boeing beat. He covered the development and launch of the Boeing 787 Dreamliner project and later the Boeing 737 MAX program, including two fatal crashes and the subsequent grounding of the aircraft. He won critical acclaim for his investigation into the 737 MAX and its automated flight control system, which had been written prior to the second crash. Gates and Times colleagues Steve Miletich, Mike Baker, and Lewis Kamb were awarded the 2019 George Polk Award in Business Reporting, the 2020 Pulitzer Prize in National Reporting, and the 2020 Gerald Loeb Award for Beat Reporting for their coverage of the Boeing 737 MAX program.

Personal life

Gates is married to Nina Shapiro, a fellow journalist at The Seattle Times whom he met while teaching in Zimbabwe. They have two adult daughters.

Selected bibliography

 "Boeing's 737 MAX Crisis", The Seattle Times – award-winning series
"Flawed analysis, failed oversight: How Boeing, FAA certified the suspect 737 MAX flight control system", March 21, 2019
"Engineers say Boeing pushed to limit safety testing in race to certify planes, including 737 MAX", May 5, 2019
"The inside story of MCAS: How Boeing's 737 MAX system gained power and lost safeguards", June 24, 2019
"Boeing rejected 737 MAX safety upgrades before fatal crashes, whistleblower says", October 3, 2019
"Boeing pushed FAA to relax 737 MAX certification requirements for crew alerts", October 3, 2019

References

21st-century American journalists
Living people
Year of birth missing (living people)
American investigative journalists
Alumni of Queen's University Belfast
Pulitzer Prize for National Reporting winners
The Seattle Times people
Journalists from Northern Ireland
People from Dungannon
Northern Ireland emigrants to the United States
Schoolteachers from Washington (state)
Mathematics educators
Gerald Loeb Award winners for Deadline and Beat Reporting